The Church of Ireland College of Education, or C.I.C.E. as it was more commonly known, was one of Ireland's five Colleges of Education which provided a Bachelor of Education (B.Ed.) degree, the qualification generally required to teach in Irish primary schools. Its degrees were awarded by Trinity College (the University of Dublin), as for the Marino Institute of Education and Froebel College of Education.  It also provided postgraduate courses in Learning Support and Special Educational Needs and a Certificate Course for Special Needs Assistants.

The college was located in Rathmines in Dublin.   It was eventually the oldest teacher training establishment in Ireland.  On 1 October 2016, the college was incorporated into Dublin City University.

History

Origins and changes of control
The history of the Church of Ireland College of Education began in 1811, when a primary teacher training college known as The Kildare Place Training Institution was founded in Dublin by the Society for Promoting Education of the Poor in Ireland.  In the 1850s this institution was taken over by the Church Education Society for the purpose of training Anglican teachers for church schools.  This in turn was taken over in 1878 by the General Synod of the Church of Ireland and six years later became a recognised denominational college with the Archbishop of Dublin as ex officio manager and chairman of the Board of Governors. In 1884, under the guidance of Archbishop Plunket, it affiliated to the state national school system.

20th century
In 1963 it was decided to sell the Kildare Place site, and Rathmines Caste was purchased for the College and school, to which they moved in 1969.  In 1934, the Principal, the Rev. Canon E.C. Hodges in 1934, had commissioned chairs and a altar, and oversaw the conversion of a classroom into a College Chapel, which was moved to St Mary's (Donnybrook parish) when the college moved to Rathmines.

Closure and legacy
In 2011 the college celebrated its bicentenary, with a number of events celebrating the college's contribution to education in Ireland.

In 2012, the Minister of Education, Ruairi Quinn, made comments regarding the reduction in the number of teacher training colleges, with a number of small colleges earmarked for closure or encouraged to merge with other institutions. Following this, the board of governors, including the principal, Anne Lodge and the Archbishop of Dublin, Michael Jackson, ended the historic link with Trinity College, and entered into negotiations with Dublin City University where CICE was fully incorporated on 1 October 2016. This proved incredibly controversial, and many people including former CICE governors and leading Church of Ireland members believed that the college was closed without adequate consultation from the archbishop and the principal.

The current DCU Institute of Education comprises DCU's own Education Department, CICE, Mater Dei Institute and St Patrick's College, Dublin (Drumcondra). The college's religious element is overseen within DCU by the Church of Ireland Centre (CIC), based on the DCU All Hallows Campus, headed up by Rev. Prof. Anne Lodge, the final Principal of CICE.

In 2022, and following the closure of St Mary's in 2020, the altar furniture from the original Church of Ireland Training College at Kildare Place, was moved to and rededicated in All Hallows Chapel, All Hallows College Chapel, DCU where the Church of Ireland Centre is, and reconsecrated by the Archbishop of Dublin, Michael Jackson, for use by Church of Ireland Centre and community there.

Academic offering
In the 1970s a Bachelor of Education degree was introduced and subsequently taught jointly by Trinity College (University of Dublin) and the Church of Ireland College of Education. The CICE course had a mandatory religious element preparing teachers to teach in Protestant run primary schools.

Facilities
Student accommodation was also available on campus for both students of the college or of other colleges.

Principals 
Principals of the College included:-
Rev. Canon Henry Kingsmill Moore DD (1884-1927) - First Principal 
Rev. Canon Evelyn Hodges (1928 to 1942), 
Rev. Canon R.J. Ross, MA. 
Dr. Kenneth Milne (1975-1984), 
Mr. Sydney Blain (1984-2009), 
Dr. Anne Lodge (2009-2016) - Final Principal

Notable alumni 
 Patrick Kennedy - the writer, bookseller and folklorist trained as a teacher in kildare place
 Rev. Trevor Sargent - former TD and Green Party Leader, subsequently trained as a priest, trained as a teacher.

External links
Official site (archive.org)
Trinity College Dublin, Official site

References

Former universities and colleges in the Republic of Ireland
Former education schools in Ireland
Educational institutions established in 1811
Educational institutions disestablished in 2016
Rathmines
Church of Ireland buildings and structures in Ireland
1811 establishments in Ireland
2016 disestablishments in Ireland
Church of Ireland